This is a list of diplomatic missions in Venezuela. There are currently 63 embassies in Caracas.  Several other countries have ambassadors accredited from other regional capitals. This listing excludes honorary consulates.

Embassies in Caracas

Missions 
 (Delegation)

Gallery

Consulates General/Consulates

Caracas
 Consulate-General

Barinas
 Consulate

Barquisimeto
 Consulate

El Amparo
 Consulate

Machiques
 Consulate

Maracaibo
 Consulate-General
 Consulate

Mérida
 Consulate

Puerto Ayacucho
 Consulate-General

Puerto La Cruz
 Consulate

Puerto Ordaz
 Consulate
 Consulate
 Consulate-General

San Antonio del Táchira
 Consulate

San Carlos del Zulia
 Consulate

San Cristóbal
 Consulate-General

San Fernando de Atabapo
 Consulate

Valencia
 Consulate
 Consulate-General
 Consulate-General

Non-Resident Embassies

Closed missions

See also 
 Foreign relations of Venezuela
 List of diplomatic missions of Venezuela

Notes

References 

List
Venezuela
Diplomatic missions